The Middle Passage was the stage of the Atlantic slave trade in which millions of enslaved Africans were transported to the Americas as part of the triangular slave trade. Ships departed Europe for African markets with manufactured goods (first side of the triangle), which were then traded for slaves with rulers of African states and other African slave traders. Slave ships (also known as Guineamen) transported the slaves across the Atlantic (second side of the triangle). The proceeds from selling slaves was then used to buy products such as hides, tobacco, sugar, rum, and raw materials, which would be transported back to northern Europe (third side of the triangle) to complete the triangle.

The First Passage was the forced march of African slaves from their inland homes, where they had often been captured by other tribes or by other members of their own tribe, to African ports where they were imprisoned until they were sold and loaded onto a ship. The Final Passage was the journey from the port of disembarkation in the Americas to the plantation or other destination where they would be put to work. The Middle Passage across the Atlantic joined these two. Voyages on the Middle Passage were large financial undertakings, generally organized by companies or groups of investors rather than individuals.

The first European slave ship transported enslaved Africans from São Tomé to New Spain in 1525. Portuguese and Dutch traders dominated the trade in the 16th and 17th centuries, though by the 18th they were supplanted by the British and French. Other European nations involved were Spain, Denmark–Norway, Sweden, Poland-Lithuania, Prussia and various Italian city states as well as traders from the United States. The enslaved Africans came mostly from the regions of Senegambia, Upper Guinea, Windward Coast, Gold Coast, Bight of Benin, Bight of Biafra, and Angola. With the growing abolitionist movement in Europe and the Americas, the transatlantic slave trade gradually declined until being fully abolished in the second-half of the 19th century. 

According to modern research, roughly 12.5 million slaves were transported through the Middle Passage to the Americas. The enslaved were transported in wretched conditions, men and women separated, across the Atlantic. Mortality was high; those with strong bodies survived. Young women and girls were raped by the crew. An estimated 15% of them died during voyage, with mortality rates considerably higher in Africa itself during the process of capturing and transporting slaves to the coast. The total number of deaths directly attributable to the Middle Passage voyage is estimated at up to two million; a broader look at African deaths directly attributable to the institution of slavery from 1500 to 1900 suggests up to four million deaths. The "Middle Passage" was considered a time of in-betweenness where captive Africans forged bonds of kinship which then created forced transatlantic communities.

Journey

The duration of the transatlantic voyage varied widely, from one to six months depending on weather conditions. The journey became more efficient over the centuries: while an average transatlantic journey of the early 16th century lasted several months, by the 19th century the crossing often required fewer than six weeks.

African kings, warlords and private kidnappers sold captives to Europeans who held several coastal forts. The captives were usually force-marched to these ports along the western coast of Africa, where they were held for sale to the European or American slave traders in the barracoons. Typical slave ships contained several hundred slaves with about 30 crew members.

The male captives were normally chained together in pairs to save space; right leg to the next man's left leg — while the women and children may have had somewhat more room. The chains or hand and leg cuffs were known as bilboes, which were among the many tools of the slave trade, and which were always in short supply. Bilboes were mainly used on men, and they consisted of two iron shackles locked on a post and were usually fastened around the ankles of two men. At best, captives were fed beans, corn, yams, rice, and palm oil. Slaves were fed one meal a day with water, if at all. When food was scarce, slaveholders would get priority over the slaves. Sometimes captives were allowed to move around during the day, but many ships kept the shackles on throughout the arduous journey.  Aboard certain French ships, the enslaved were brought on deck to periodically receive fresh air.  While the enslaved females were typically permitted to be on deck more frequently, enslaved males would be watched closely to prevent revolt when above deck.

The enslaved below the decks lived for months in conditions of squalor and indescribable horror. Disease spread and ill health was one of the biggest killers. Mortality rates were high, and death made these conditions below the decks even worse. Even though the corpses were thrown overboard, many crew members avoided going into the hold. The enslaved who had already been ill ridden were not always found immediately. Many of the living enslaved could have been shackled to someone that was dead for hours and sometimes days.

Most contemporary historians estimate that between 9.4 and 12.6 million Africans embarked for the New World. Disease and starvation due to the length of the passage were the main contributors to the death toll with amoebic dysentery and scurvy causing the majority of deaths. Additionally, outbreaks of smallpox, syphilis, measles, and other diseases spread rapidly in the close-quarter compartments.

The rate of death increased with the length of the voyage, since the incidence of dysentery and of scurvy increased with longer stints at sea as the quality and amount of food and water diminished. In addition to physical sickness, many of the enslaved became too depressed to eat or function efficiently due to loss of freedom, family, security, and their own humanity.

Sailing technologies
The need for profits in the 18th century's Atlantic market economy drove changes in ship designs and in managing human cargo, which included enslaved Africans and the mostly European crew. Improvements in air flow on board the ships helped to decrease the infamous mortality rate that these ships had become known for throughout the 16th and 17th centuries. The new designs that allowed ships to navigate faster and into rivers' mouths ensured access to many more enslaving posts along the West African coast.  The monetary value of enslaved Africans on any given American auction-block during the mid-18th century ranged between $800 and $1,200, which in modern times would be equivalent to $32,000–48,000 per person ($100 then is now worth $4,000 due to inflation). Therefore, ship captains and investors sought technologies that would protect their human cargo.

Throughout the height of the Atlantic slave trade (1570–1808), ships that transported the enslaved were normally smaller than traditional cargo ships, with most ships that transported the enslaved, weighing between 150 and 250 tons. This equated to about 350 to 450 enslaved Africans on each slave ship, or 1.5 to 2.4 per ton. The English ships of the time normally fell on the larger side of this spectrum and the French on the smaller side. Ships purposely designed to be smaller and more maneuverable were meant to navigate the African coastal rivers into farther inland ports; these ships therefore increased the effects of the slave trade on Africa. Additionally, the ships' sizes increased slightly throughout the 1700s; however the number of enslaved Africans per ship remained the same. This reduction in the ratio of enslaved Africans to ship tonnage was designed to increase the amount of space per person and thus improve the survival chances of everyone on board. These ships also had temporary storage decks which were separated by an open latticework or grate bulkhead, Ship masters would presumably use these chambers to divide enslaved Africans and help prevent mutiny. Some ships developed by the turn of the 19th century even had ventilation ports built into the sides and between gun ports (with hatches to keep inclement weather out). These open deck designs increased airflow and thus helped improve survival rates, diminishing potential investment losses.

Another major factor in "cargo protection" was the increase in knowledge of diseases and medicines (along with the inclusion of a variety of medicines on the ships). First the Dutch East India Company in the 18th century, followed by some other countries and companies in the late 18th early 19th centuries, realized that the inclusion of surgeons and other medical practitioners aboard their ships was an endeavor that proved too costly for the benefits. So instead of including medical personnel they just stocked the ships with a large variety of medicines; while this was better than no medicines, and given the fact that many crew members at least had some idea of how disease was spread, without the inclusion of medical personnel the mortality rate was still very high in the 18th century.

Treatment of enslaved people and resistance
"Treatment" of the enslaved was horrific because the captured African men and women were considered less than human; they were "cargo", or "goods", and treated as such; they were transported for marketing. Women with children were not as desirable for they took up too much space and toddlers were not wanted because of everyday maintenance. For example, the Zong, a British enslaver, took too many enslaved on a voyage to the New World in 1781. Overcrowding combined with malnutrition and disease killed several crew members and around 60 enslaved. Bad weather made the Zong voyage slow and lack of drinking water became a concern. The crew decided to drown some slaves at sea, to conserve water and allow the owners to collect insurance for lost cargo. About 130 slaves were killed and a number chose to kill themselves in defiance, by jumping into the water willingly. The Zong incident became fuel for the abolitionist movement and a major court case, as the insurance company refused to compensate for the loss.

While the enslaved were kept fed and supplied with drink as healthy slaves were more valuable, if resources ran low on the long, unpredictable voyages, the crew received preferential treatment. Punishment of the enslaved and torture was very common, as on the voyage the crew had to turn independent people into obedient enslaved. Pregnant women on the ships who delivered their babies aboard risked the chance of their children being killed in order for the mothers to be sold. The worst punishments were for rebelling; in one instance a captain punished a failed rebellion by killing one involved enslaved man immediately, and forcing two other slaves to eat his heart and liver.

As a way to counteract disease and suicide attempts, the crew would force the enslaved onto the deck of the ship for exercise, usually resulting in beatings because the enslaved would be unwilling to dance for them or interact. These beatings would often be severe and could result in the enslaved dying or becoming more susceptible to diseases.

Suicide 
Slaves resisted in many ways. The two most common types of resistance were refusal to eat and suicide. Suicide was a frequent occurrence, often by refusal of food or medicine or jumping overboard, as well as by a variety of other opportunistic means. If an enslaved person jumped overboard, they would often be left to drown or shot from the boat. Over the centuries, some African peoples, such as the Kru, came to be understood as holding substandard value as slaves, because they developed a reputation for being too proud to be enslaved, and for attempting suicide immediately upon losing their freedom.

Both suicide and self-starving were prevented as much as possible by enslaver crews; the enslaved were often force-fed or tortured until they ate, though some still managed to starve themselves to death;  the enslaved were kept away from means of suicide, and the sides of the deck were often netted. The enslaved were still successful, especially at jumping overboard. Often when an uprising failed, the mutineers would jump en masse into the sea. Slaves generally believed that if they jumped overboard, they would be returned to their family and friends in their village or to their ancestors in the afterlife.

Suicide by jumping overboard was such a problem that captains had to address it directly in many cases. They used the sharks that followed the ships as a terror weapon. One captain, who had a rash of suicides on his ship, took a woman and lowered her into the water on a rope, and pulled her out as fast as possible. When she came in view, the sharks had already killed her—and bitten off the lower half of her body.

Identity and communication 
In order to interact with each other on the voyage, the  enslaved created a communication system unbeknownst to Europeans: They would construct choruses on the passages using their voices, bodies, and ships themselves; the hollow design of the ships allowed  the enslaved to use them as percussive instruments and to amplify their songs. This combination of "instruments" was both a way for the enslaved to communicate as well as create a new identity since enslavers attempted to strip them of that. Although most of the enslaved were from various regions around Africa, their situation allowed them to come together and create a new culture and identity aboard the ships with a common language and method of communication:[C]all and response soundings allowed men and women speaking different languages to communicate about the conditions of their captivity. In fact, on board the Hubridas, what began as murmurs and morphed into song erupted before long into the shouts and cries of coordinated revolt.This communication was a direct subversion of European authority and allowed  the enslaved to have a form of power and identity otherwise prohibited. Furthermore, such organization and coming together enabled revolts and uprisings to actually be coordinated and successful at times.

Uprisings 
Aboard ships, the captives were not always willing to follow orders. Sometimes they reacted in violence. Slave ships were designed and operated to try to prevent the slaves from revolting. Resistance among the slaves usually ended in failure and participants in the rebellion were punished severely. About one out of ten ships experienced some sort of rebellion.

Ottobah Cugoano, who was enslaved and taken from Africa as a child, later described an uprising aboard the ship on which he was transported to the West Indies:

When we found ourselves at last taken away, death was more preferable than life, and a plan was concerted amongst us, that we might burn and blow up the ship, and to perish all together in the flames.

The number of rebels varied widely; often the uprisings would end with the death of a few slaves and crew. Surviving rebels were punished or executed as examples to the other slaves on board.

African religion 
The enslaved also resisted through certain manifestations of their religions and mythology. They would appeal to their gods for protection and vengeance upon their captors, and would also try to curse and otherwise harm the crew using idols and fetishes. One crew found fetishes in their water supply, placed by the enslaved who believed they would kill all who drank from it.

Sailors and crew
While the owners and captains of slave ships could expect vast profits, the ordinary sailors were often badly paid and subject to brutal discipline. Sailors often had to live and sleep without shelter on the open deck for the entirety of the Atlantic voyage as the entire space below deck was occupied by enslaved people.

A crew mortality rate of around 20% was expected during a voyage, with sailors dying as a result of disease (specifically malaria and yellow fever), flogging or slave uprisings. A high crew mortality rate on the return voyage was in the captain's interests as it reduced the number of sailors who had to be paid on reaching the home port. Crew members who survived were frequently cheated out of their wages on their return.

The sailors were often employed through coercion as they generally knew about and hated the slave trade. In port towns, recruiters and tavern owners would induce sailors to become very drunk (and indebted) and then offer to relieve their debt if they signed contracts with slave ships. If they did not, they would be imprisoned. Sailors in prison had a hard time getting jobs outside of the slave ship industry since most other maritime industries would not hire "jail-birds", so they were forced to go to the slave ships anyway.

See also

 Abolitionism
 Abolitionism in the United Kingdom
 Abolitionism in the United States
 Asiento de Negros
 Atlantic slave trade
 European colonization of the Americas
 History of Africa
 Indian Ocean slave trade
 Maafa
 Press gang
 Slave ship
 Triangular trade

References

Further reading

External links
"Last Voyage of the Slave Ship Henrietta Marie", National Geographic, archived from the original
A Slave Ship Speaks (PDF), archived from the original

African slave trade
History of the Atlantic Ocean
Pre-emancipation African-American history